The Wall is an American television game show airing on NBC, which premiered on December 19, 2016. The show is hosted by Chris Hardwick, who also serves as executive producer on the show along with LeBron James, Maverick Carter, and Andrew Glassman.

In 2018, Telemundo announced plans for a Spanish-language version of The Wall, which premiered in January 2020. Telemundo's version of the game show is hosted by Marco Antonio Regil.

Broadcast
Two special episodes aired on November 22, 2017 and December 27, 2017. A special Christmas themed episode aired on December 4, 2017. The second half of the second season premiered on January 1, 2018. Season 3 premiered on March 15, 2020. After going on a brief hiatus in July 2020, new episodes resumed broadcast on September 24, 2020. On September 30, 2020, the series was renewed for a fourth season of 20 episodes. The fourth season premiered on January 4, 2021. A special Tokyo 2020 Olympics episode aired to raise money for the Team USA fund on February 22, 2021. A special Red Nose Day episode aired on May 27, 2021. After going on a brief hiatus in September 2021, new episodes resumed broadcast on November 12, 2021. The fifth season is set to premiere on April 11, 2023.

Gameplay
The Wall is a four-story tall (40 ft) pegboard, similar to a pachinko game or bean machine; it also is similar to the board used for the Plinko pricing game on The Price Is Right. The bottom of the board is divided into 15 slots marked with various U.S. dollar amounts; eight of these range from $1 to $100 and remain constant throughout the game, while the others have higher values and increase from round to round. Balls can be put into play from seven numbered "drop zones" on the top edge of the board, directly above the seven centermost money slots.

A team of two contestants plays each game, attempting to bank as much money as possible by answering questions correctly and landing balls in high-value slots. Green balls dropped on the board will add to the team's bank, while red balls dropped on the board will subtract from it. Throughout the game, the bank has a floor of $0.

Round 1: Free Fall
In Free Fall, the team is asked a series of five questions, each with two answer choices. As each question is asked, three balls are simultaneously released from drop zones 1, 4, and 7. The team must select one answer and lock it in before the first ball crosses the threshold of a money slot. If the team's answer is correct, the balls turn green and their values are added to the team's bank. If the team answers incorrectly or fails to lock in an answer, the balls turn red and their values are subtracted from the team's bank.

If the team's bank balance is zero at the end of this round, the game ends immediately and they leave without any winnings. Otherwise, their earnings become part of a guaranteed payout to be offered to them at the end of the game.

Starting with Season 4, the team may choose to double the total value of any one question by pressing a gold "Free Fall Plus" disk while the balls are falling.

The highest amount that a team can bank in this round is $375,000 in the first three seasons; this was later increased to $450,000 for the fourth season.

The values on the board range from $1 to $25,000, and are arranged as follows:

Round 2
At the start of the second round, the contestants are separated from each other for the rest of the game. One enters an isolation chamber behind The Wall, while the other remains onstage. A set number of green balls are played simultaneously at the beginning of the round. Three multiple-choice questions are then played, each with three answer choices. The onstage player is shown only the answers to each question and must decide which drop zone to use, based on how confident he/she is that the isolated player can answer correctly. The question and answers are then presented to the isolated player. After he/she responds, the ball is dropped from the chosen zone. A correct answer turns the ball green and adds the value of the slot it lands in to the team bank, while a wrong answer turns the ball red and deducts the value. The isolated player is not told which of his/her answers are correct or given any information on the team bank until he/she is brought out of isolation near the end of the game.

The onstage player is offered an opportunity to "Double Up" on the second question and "Triple Up" on the third. These options allow the onstage player to play two or three balls from the selected drop zone instead of one, respectively. After the third question, if the banked total is at least $1 more than the number of green balls played at the start of the round, an equal number of red balls are played simultaneously from the same zones.

In the first two seasons, two initial green balls were played from different zones chosen by the onstage player, and a team could bank up to $1,999,998. Beginning with the third season, seven initial green balls are played in a "SuperDrop," one from every zone, and a team could bank up to $3,249,993; the maximum slot value was reduced to $150,000 for the fourth season, lowering the maximum for this round to $1,949,993.

The values on the board range from $1 to $250,000 (later $150,000), and are arranged as follows:

Round 3
Gameplay proceeds as in Round 2, but each of the three questions now has four answer choices. In addition, four green and four red balls are played at the start and end of the round respectively, and are dropped one at a time, rather than simultaneously. The "Double Up" and "Triple Up" options are available as before. The maximum amount that a team can bank in this round is $9,999,996.

The values on the board range from $1 to $1,000,000, and are arranged as follows:

Final Decision
After the third question in Round 3, the isolated player is sent a contract by the host and must decide to either sign it or tear it up. Signing the contract gives up the team bank in favor of a guaranteed payout, equal to the Free Fall winnings plus an additional $20,000 for every question answered correctly in Rounds 2 and 3. If the isolated player tears up the contract, the team receives their final bank total instead. After the four red balls have dropped in Round 3 and the final bank is calculated (or after the last question if the bank is $3 or less), the isolated player returns to the stage to reveal his/her decision. Only at this point does he/she learn the number of correct answers given, the payout total, and the team's final bank.

The maximum possible guaranteed payout in the first two seasons is $495,000, obtained by scoring $375,000 in Free Fall and answering all six questions correctly in Rounds 2 and 3. The maximum possible bank total in the first two seasons is $12,374,994, obtained by answering every question correctly, using every Double Up and Triple Up option, having every green ball drop into the highest-valued slot, and having the six mandatory red balls each drop into a $1 slot. In the third season, the maximum possible total is $13,624,989 due to the increased number of mandatory green and red balls in Round 2. For the fourth season, the maximum payout and bank totals are $570,000 and $12,399,989, respectively, achieved through use of the double-value option in Free Fall, and the reduced maximum slot value in Round 2.

Episodes

Color key
 The contestants won at least $1,000,000.
 The contestants left with the larger possible amount.
 The contestants left with the smaller possible amount.
 The contestants left with nothing at all.

Season 1

Season 2

Season 3

Season 4

Critical reception
The Wall has received mixed reviews by critics. Jan Chaney of Vulture dubbed The Wall as being "the most stereotypically American game show on television right now" and "absurd yet undeniably diverting." Chaney criticized the show for making "attempts to sell us something new, even though its concept is really based on old ideas [...] mixed up just enough [to] seem fresh".

Bethonie Butler of the Chicago Tribune agreed that "The Wall looks a lot like the famed Plinko game from CBS", but qualified that "originality is relative when it comes to game shows", remarking on the similarity between popular trivia game shows such as Who Wants to Be a Millionaire and Are You Smarter than a 5th Grader?

European production 
In Europe the production is made in a studio in Poland where the 4 stories high wall is located. The crew of the show are mostly a local Polish crew and the producers, the host and participants flown in time to the filming of the show.

International versions
Legend: 
 Currently airing  
 No longer airing  
 Upcoming version

See also
 Peggle – a similar game published by PopCap Games
 Tipping Point – a similar game show airing in the United Kingdom, whereby counters worth £50 are dropped into a "win zone" to win money
 The Price Is Right – the Plinko game is similar to this game show

Notes

References

External links 
 
 

Endemol Shine Group franchises
NBC original programming
2016 American television series debuts
2010s American game shows
2020s American game shows
English-language television shows
Television series by SpringHill Entertainment
Television series by Banijay
LeBron James